The river Bille is a small, slow-flowing German river in Stormarn, Schleswig-Holstein and Hamburg, a right tributary of the Elbe. Its source is near Linau, north of the heathland Hahnheide forest. It then flows south of Trittau, representing the border between Stormarn and Lauenburg, continues south of Reinbek and reaches the river Elbe near Billwerder. A lot of old estates and tasteful parks are laid out along its riverbank. Its total length is 65 km.

The Bille is one of three rivers which flow through the city of Hamburg, the other two being the Elbe and the Alster.

Tributaries
The upper Bille drains a wide catchment area with many brooks and small stretches of water. Main tributaries are the Corbek feeding the Bille near Witzhave and the Schwarze Au at Aumühle, having drained wide parts of the large Sachsenwald forest.

Landmarks

 Grander Mühle, an ancient watermill at Kuddewörde, dating back to 1303
 Schloss Reinbek, a castle from 1572
 Schloss Bergedorf, a castle showing wooden raftwork and Brick Gothic

See also
List of rivers of Schleswig-Holstein
List of rivers of Hamburg

External links

 Much information on Bille from the Hamburg Department of the Environment (German)

Rivers of Hamburg
Rivers of Schleswig-Holstein
 
Rivers of Germany